Mohanad Salem Ghazi Marzouq Al-Amin Al-Enazi (born 1 March 1985) is an Emirati professional footballer who plays as a defender former the United Arab Emirates national team.

At club level, he has played in the 2010 AFC Champions League. Salem has also represented the United Arab Emirates internationally since 2008.

Personal life
Salem is the brother of former Qatari footballer Mohammed Salem Al-Enazi.

Career statistics

International
Scores and results list United Arab Emirates' goal tally first.

Honours
United Arab Emirates
 Gulf Cup of Nations: 2013
 AFC Asian Cup third-place: 2015

References

External links

 UAE FA profile
 Al Ain FC profile

1985 births
Living people
People from Doha
Emirati footballers
Association football defenders
Al Wahda FC players
Al Dhafra FC players
Al Ain FC players
Al-Ittihad Kalba SC players
UAE First Division League players
UAE Pro League players
United Arab Emirates international footballers
2015 AFC Asian Cup players
Naturalized citizens of the United Arab Emirates